"Tiny Meat" is the second single from the debut album Salt Peter by the trip hop/Industrial band Ruby. It is the band's best known song, and was released in 1995 in the United States by the WORK/Creation labels. "Tiny Meat" is the only single from Ruby that has charted in the U.S., reaching #22 on Billboard's Modern Rock Tracks in the spring of 1996. The single also charted in the United Kingdom, reaching #96.

Track listing 
The CD single came in two parts, each with three tracks on them:

 part one
 "Tiny Meat" (album version) (4:03) -Rankine, Walk
 "Tiny Meat" (Danny Saber Mix) (5:06) -Rankine, Walk 
 "Heidi" (Scream Team Remix) (7:48) -Rankine, Walk 
total length: (16:57)

 part two
 "Tiny Meat" (meat for the feet mix) (6:24) -Rankine, Walk
 "Tiny Meat" (Mark Walk mix) (4:28) -Rankine, Walk 
 "Scunner" (4:02) -Rankine, Walk 
total length: (14:54)

Chart performance

Singles

Production & personnel 
part one:
track one
Produced by Mark Walk & Lesley Rankine, and mixed by Walk.

track two
Produced by Walk & Rankine.
Remixed by Danny Saber, engineering & livestock mutilation by John X.

track three
Produced by Walk & Rankine.
Remix produced by The Scream Team for Worldwide Scream Team Productions, Engineered & mixed by Tim Holmes.

Artwork for the CD single by Rankine, photographs by Matthew Donaldson, and layout by Toby Egelnick.

part two:
track one
Produced by Walk & Rankine.

track two
Produced by Walk & Rankine.

track three
Produced by Walk & Rankine.

Music video 
As with all of Ruby's singles, this track had a promotional video made for it.

References

External links 
 Official artist website (archived)

1995 singles
Ruby (band) songs
British alternative rock songs